More D4ta (anagram of "Moderat 4") is the fourth studio album by electronic trio Moderat, and their first after a six-year hiatus. Released on May 13, 2022, it was preceded by the release of the singles "Fast Land", "Easy Prey" and "More Love".

The group embarked on an international tour in support of the album, which started in June 2022.

Critical reception

At Metacritic, which assigns a normalised rating out of 100 to reviews from mainstream publications, the album received an average score of 78 based on 4 reviews, indicating "generally favorable reviews".

Track listing

References

2022 albums
Moderat albums